Awan Town (Punjabi, Shahrak-e-Awan) is a neighbourhood and union council (UC 110) located in Iqbal Town Tehsil of Lahore, Punjab, Pakistan. Awan Town is predominantly a middle class residential neighbourhood located on Multan Road. Awan Town is divided into 8 residential blocks.

Ahmad Block
Ali Block
Jinnah Block
Kausar Block
Madina Block
Qutab Block
Rizwan Block
Usman Block

Post Office 

Postal code of Awan Town Post office is 54780.

See also 
Hassan Town

Iqbal Town, Lahore